Oviedo Rugby Club is a Spanish rugby union club. The club was established in 1983 and currently competes in the División de Honor B de Rugby competition, the second level of Spanish club  rugby. The club is based in Oviedo, Asturias and it is considered the most successful team in the Asturian rugby. Oviedo RC plays in blue and white colours. The team played in the División de Honor in four seasons (1990–91, 1998–99, 1999-2000, 2000–01).

Since the 2014–15 season, the team plays with the name of Real Oviedo Rugby after a sponsorship agreement with the local football club.

Trophies
Primera Nacional: 
Champions: 1989-90, 1994–95, 1995–96, 1997–98
Runners-up: 1988-89, 1996–97
Asturian Regional Championship

Season by season

4 seasons in División de Honor

International honours
 Xabier Guerediaga
 Carlos Souto Vidal (played 1999 Rugby World Cup)
 Sergio Souto Vidal (played 1999 Rugby World Cup)
 Luis Javier Martinez Villanueva (played 1999 Rugby World Cup) 
 Aitor Etxeberria de la Rosa (played 1999 Rugby World Cup)
 Fernando Tejada Chacon
 Joaquin Uria Hidalgo
 Luis Alfonso Cano García

External links
Official site 

Spanish rugby union teams
Sport in Oviedo
Rugby clubs established in 1983
Sports teams in Asturias